Project 404 was the code name for a covert United States Air Force advisory mission to Laos during the later years of the Second Indochina War, which would eventually become known in the United States as the Vietnam War. The purpose of the mission was to supply the line crew technicians needed to support and train the Royal Laotian Air Force, while Raven Forward Air Controllers were brought in to supply piloting expertise and guidance for running a tactical air force. The two programs together comprised Palace Dog.

 

Project 404 began in 1966, as a successor after the completion of Operation White Star, was smaller in scope, and was an adjunct to the various covert ground operations succeeding White Star. Because Laos was ostensibly a neutral party to the conflict between the United States and North Vietnam, the airmen did not wear United States Air Force uniforms, but instead worked in civilian clothing.

See also
First Indochina War
International Agreement on the Neutrality of Laos
Laotian Civil War (also known as the Secret War)
Operation White Star
Ho Chi Minh Trail
North Vietnamese invasion of Laos
Royal Lao Army
Royal Lao Air Force
Lieutenant Colonel Lee Lue
Major General Vang Pao
Vang Sue
William H. Sullivan U.S. Ambassador
Vietnam War (aka the Second Indochina War)

References

External links
Senate Committee on POWs: "Covert Operations"
Air America, CAS, Project 404, etc. website
Air America Association web site
Online Archive Materials about Air America in the Vietnam Archive at Texas Tech
Air America  by Christopher Robbins
The Ravens, Pilots of the Secret War in Laos by Christopher Robbins
Laos List (partial list of U.S. personnel in Laos)

Vietnam War
Counterinsurgency
Military operations involving the United States
History of Laos (1945–present)
20th century in Laos
Military history of Laos
Laos–United States relations
Laotian Civil War